The Treasurer of Tasmania is the title held by the Cabinet Minister who is responsible for the financial management of Tasmania’s budget sector.

List of Tasmanian treasurers

References

Tasmania
Tasmania-related lists
 
Ministers of the Tasmanian state government